O Priya Tumi Kothay (Bengali: ও প্রিয়া তুমি কোথায়) is a Bangladeshi music album by Asif Akbar. It was released on 30 January 2001 by the banner of Soundtek. Asif made his music debut with blockbuster hit album. The album sold about 60 lac copy and became the highest grossing audio album in Bangladesh history of all time.

Track listing

Film Soundtrack 

O Priya Tumi Kothay is a Bengali popular song by singer Asif Akbar. The album O Priya Tumi Kothay was released on 2001.The meaning of the song name in English is O Darling where are you? The song gained most popularity with home and also abroad. The song O Priya Tumi Kothay has been listening more than 70 million times on YouTube channel.

References

External links 
 Original Silver Disc Rip File 'FLAC/Mp3'
 Full Album Video

2001 albums